Halid Šabanović (born 22 August 1999) is a Bosnian professional footballer who plays as a right-back for Ligue 1 club Angers.

Šabanović started his professional career at Sarajevo, who loaned him to Mladost Doboj Kakanj in 2021. In 2022, he joined Angers.

Club career

Sarajevo
Šabanović started playing football at a local club, before joining youth academy of his hometown club Sarajevo in 2016. In July 2017, he signed his first professional contract with the team. He made his professional debut against Krupa on 3 March 2018 at the age of 18. On 22 September, he scored his first professional goal against the same opponent. He won his first trophy with the club on 15 May 2019, by beating Široki Brijeg in Bosnian Cup final.

In January 2020, Šabanović signed a new two-year deal with Sarajevo.

In January 2021, he was loaned to Mladost Doboj Kakanj until the end of season.

Angers
In June 2022, Šabanović was transferred to French outfit Angers for an undisclosed fee. He made his official debut for the team on 7 August against Nantes.

International career
Šabanović represented Bosnia and Herzegovina at various youth levels.

Career statistics

Club

Honours
Sarajevo
Bosnian Premier League: 2018–19, 2019–20 
Bosnian Cup: 2018–19

References

External links

1999 births
Living people
Footballers from Sarajevo
Bosniaks of Bosnia and Herzegovina
Bosnia and Herzegovina Muslims
Bosnia and Herzegovina footballers
Bosnia and Herzegovina youth international footballers
Bosnia and Herzegovina under-21 international footballers
Bosnia and Herzegovina expatriate footballers
Association football fullbacks
FK Sarajevo players
FK Mladost Doboj Kakanj players
Angers SCO players
Premier League of Bosnia and Herzegovina players
Ligue 1 players
Expatriate footballers in France
Bosnia and Herzegovina expatriate sportspeople in France